There are several companies with Digital Research Labs in their name or that are otherwise similarly named:

Digital Research, a defunct microcomputer operating system (CP/M, DR-DOS) vendor founded by Gary Kildall
Threshold Digital Research Labs, a digital animation studio
DEC Systems Research Center, the research arm of Digital Equipment Corporation

See also
Digital Research Systems Group (disambiguation)